Sophie Tendai Chandauka MBE is a Zimbabwe-born corporate finance lawyer, entrepreneur and Head of Americas Risk Management and Intelligence at Meta. Previously, Chandauka was Global COO of Shared Services and Banking Operations at Morgan Stanley based in New York and prior to this, she was CAO of the Legal and Compliance Division of Morgan Stanley in EMEA, based in London. Before joining Morgan Stanley, she was the Head of Group Treasury (Legal) at Virgin Money in London.  She began her career as a corporate finance lawyer and Senior Associate at Baker McKenzie in London.  Apart from her professional achievements, she is recognised in the United Kingdom for her community work as an advocate for education, equality, diversity and inclusion and also as a mentor for young entrepreneurs and aspiring lawyers.

Education
Following primary and secondary education in Harare, Zimbabwe, in 1994, Chandauka was selected to be sponsored by Rotary International to represent her country as a Rotary Youth Exchange student for a year in Sault Ste. Marie, Ontario, Canada. Upon completion of her year in Canada, the Board of Trustees of Lake Superior State University (LSSU) in Michigan awarded Chandauka an academic scholarship for her undergraduate degree.

In her third year of undergraduate study, while undertaking an internship with the Association of Flight Attendants in Washington, D.C., she was awarded a further scholarship as a Rotary Ambassadorial Scholar to the United Kingdom, where she attended the University of Birmingham for a year. On returning to LSSU, Chandauka was awarded a Bachelor of Science degree with highest academic distinction (summa cum laude) and was also selected as the commencement speaker for LSSU's graduating class of the year 2000.  Chandauka returned to the United Kingdom where in September 2001, she commenced legal studies at The College of Law of England and Wales and the Oxford Institute of Legal Practice of Oxford University and Oxford Brookes University, before commencing her apprenticeship in September 2003 and qualifying, in September 2005, as a corporate lawyer with Baker & McKenzie in London.

Chandauka was invited to return to her alma mater, LSSU, to address the Class of 2011 at commencement proceedings in April 2011.

Career and awards
Since qualification, Chandauka has worked on a number of high-profile transactions, including the attempted hostile takeover of the London Stock Exchange Group by the Macquarie Group; the acquisition of The Body Shop by L'Oréal;  Nike, Inc.’s acquisition of Umbro; and the initial public offering (IPO) of Ferrexpo as the first Ukrainian company to be listed on the London Stock Exchange.

In 2007, Chandauka was shortlisted as a finalist for the British Legal Awards "Young Solicitor of the Year". In 2008, she was shortlisted as a finalist for The Lawyer Awards "Assistant Solicitor of the Year". Also in that year, Chandauka was selected as one of Management Today’s "35 Women Under 35" businesswomen to watch and was featured on the cover of the July 2008 issue of the magazine with four other women.

In the same year, Chandauka was invited to Lake Superior State University to receive the Paul Ripley Young Alumna Award. In autumn 2011, she was shortlisted as a finalist for the Women of the Future Awards. In March 2013 she was featured in Financial News’ editorial pick of 40 Rising Stars in the European legal profession aged under 40.  Chandauka has been featured as one of the top 100 most influential Black Britons on the Power List 2014, 2015 and 2016. She has also featured as one of the top 100 most influential ethnic minority business leaders in the Britain in the Financial Times and Sunday Times. She is a member of the Executive Leadership Council (ELC) — the preeminent membership organisation committed to increasing the number of senior black executives in global enterprises.

In the 2021 Queen's birthday honours she was awarded an MBE "for services to Diversity in Business."

Community involvement
Throughout her academic pursuits and career, Chandauka has actively volunteered time as a personal mentor to many young people and as a motivational speaker to a number of social mobility organisations and schools, and has been an advocate for education of young people and empowerment of women.  
In 1999, she was made a Paul Harris Fellow of Rotary International, one of the highest honours of this organisation, for her exemplary work as a young ambassador for world peace and understanding. In 2008, Chandauka was appointed to the Board of Trustees of Sentebale ("Forget Me Not" in Sesotho), the African children's charity that was established by Prince Seeiso of Lesotho and Prince Harry to help vulnerable children and young people in Lesotho, particularly those who have been orphaned as a result of HIV/AIDS.

In 2013 to March 2014, she served as co-chair of the board of trustees for the BLD Foundation. The BLD Foundation's mission is to support young people from ethnic minority and/or socio-economically underprivileged backgrounds in Britain, and with an interest in law, towards achieving their fullest potential by providing them with knowledge and information about the opportunities available in the legal profession, equipping them with the skills to take advantage of these opportunities, and providing them with access to work placements and recruitment opportunities in leading firms and chambers across Britain.

In 2014, Chandauka co-founded and was appointed as the chair of the judging panel of the Black British Business Awards, which were endorsed by former prime minister David Cameron and former secretary of state for business Sir Vince Cable as the only premium awards programme of its kind in Britain. Its goals are to shine a light on the often unsung significant contribution of entrepreneurs and professions of black African and Caribbean heritage to the British economy across all sectors. The Awards have received exceptional endorsement and support from across the business and political spectrum, including more than 25 multinational corporations.

In 2016, Chandauka was appointed as a member of the board of trustees of Protimos, an organisation of development lawyers who provide access to law and legal education for impoverished and marginalised communities in resource rich emerging economies.

References

External links
Morgan Stanley Website
Virgin Money Website
Baker McKenzie Website
ELC Website
Sentebale Website
BLD Foundation Website
Protimos Website
BBBAwards Website

Zimbabwean women lawyers
Zimbabwean emigrants to the United Kingdom
Living people
1978 births
Alumni of the University of Birmingham
21st-century English lawyers